Andriy Derkach (born 28 May 1985) is a Ukrainian footballer.

References

External links

1985 births
Living people
Ukrainian footballers
Association football midfielders
Ukrainian expatriate footballers
Expatriate footballers in Moldova
Expatriate footballers in Uzbekistan
Expatriate footballers in Belarus
FC Borysfen Boryspil players
FC Borysfen-2 Boryspil players
FC Systema-Boreks Borodianka players
FC Shakhtar Donetsk players
FC Shakhtar-2 Donetsk players
FC Shakhtar-3 Donetsk players
FC Dnipro Cherkasy players
FC Volyn Lutsk players
FC Hoverla Uzhhorod players
FC Prykarpattia Ivano-Frankivsk (2004) players
FC Helios Kharkiv players
FC Zimbru Chișinău players
FC Poltava players
FK Mash'al Mubarek players
FC Arsenal Kyiv players
FC Dnepr Mogilev players
PFC Sumy players
FC Hirnyk-Sport Horishni Plavni players